The 1946 Western Maryland Green Terror football team was an American football team that represented Western Maryland College (now known as McDaniel College) as a member of the Mason–Dixon Conference during the 1946 college football season. In its first season under head coach Charlie Havens, the team compiled an undefeated 5–2 record (4–1 against conference opponents) and outscored opponent by a total of 168 to 94.

Schedule

References

Western Maryland
McDaniel Green Terror football seasons
Western Maryland Green Terror football